Dams and reservoirs in Afghanistan are used for irrigation, water supply, hydro-electric power generation or combination of these. The Afghan government continues to seek technical assistance from neighboring and regional countries to build more dams. Below are a map and a chart showing some of Afghanistan's dams and reservoirs.

Location map of major reservoirs and dams

List of major reservoirs and dams in Afghanistan

Dams reported to be under construction in various parts of Afghanistan
 Aino Mina Dam and reservoir in the city of Kandahar (mainly for providing fresh water to the city residents).
 Bagh Dara Dam in Kapisa Province.
 Dahan Dara Dam in northwestern Faryab Province.
 Kunar Dam in Surtak in Kunar Province.
 Lawari Dam in Kandahar Province.
 Manogi Power Dam in Kunar Province.
 Palto Dam in Sharana, Paktika Province.
 Two dams in Baghlan Province. One is named Pul-e-Khumri Dam.

See also
 List of rivers of Afghanistan
 Water supply in Afghanistan
 Energy in Afghanistan
 International rankings of Afghanistan
 Environmental issues in Afghanistan
 List of tallest buildings and structures in Afghanistan

References

External links

 
 
 

dams
Environment of Afghanistan
Water supply and sanitation in Afghanistan
Afghanistan